There are 219 engineering colleges affiliated to Visvesvaraya Technological University (VTU), which is in Belgaum in the state of Karnataka, India. This list is categorised into two parts, autonomous colleges and non-autonomous colleges. Autonomous colleges are bestowed academic independence allowing them to form their own syllabus and conduct their own examinations.

A college may be classified as government run, private unaided, or private aided. A government college receives full funding from the Government of Karnataka, while a private unaided college receives no funding from the government. In a private aided college, one or more of its courses receives partial funding from the government. An autonomous college enjoys academic independence which gives it the freedom to revise the syllabus with time and follow a schedule which is more suitable for the set curriculum. Almost all engineering colleges in Karnataka are affiliated to VTU, notable exceptions being University Visvesvaraya College of Engineering, National Institute of Technology Karnataka, PES University and Manipal Institute of Technology.

Table legend

The list is further categorised into private, government aided, and government colleges.

Government Colleges

Private colleges

Autonomous colleges
Autonomy, as granted by the University Grants Commission, in concurrence with the Government of Karnataka, has been conferred upon selected colleges, which grants upon them, certain special privileges.

Autonomous colleges can frame their own schemes of study, curricula and evaluation, without need of the approval of the university. These colleges also have the freedom to conduct add on courses and supplementary semesters for students who may be in need of it. They also have the freedom to avail grants from funding agencies. All of these privileges are not granted to non-autonomous colleges.

Autonomy is granted in order to obtain better placements for students, to have better college-industry interaction, and also to enable colleges to continuously update and modernize the curriculum.

References

Visvesvaraya Technological University
Engineering colleges
Visvesvaraya Technological University
Visvesvaraya Technological University